The Weweantic River is a  river in southeastern Massachusetts. Its name means "crooked" or "wandering stream" in the Wampanoag language.

The river arises in wetlands in Carver, meanders generally south through swampy birch and maple forests in Middleborough and Rochester, and drains into a Buzzards Bay estuary in Wareham near the mouth of the Sippican River.

Although the river has historically abounded in fish and shellfish, it currently has no significant herring population due to dam obstruction below Horseshoe Pond, and is closed to shellfish harvesting due to bacterial contamination.

References 

 Save Buzzards Bay
 Environmental Protection Agency
 List of place names of Native American origin in New England

Wareham, Massachusetts
Rivers of Plymouth County, Massachusetts
Rivers of Massachusetts